is a Japanese manga series written and illustrated by Yuki Urushibara. It was serialized in Kodansha's seinen manga magazine Afternoon Season Zōkan from 1999 to 2002, and in Monthly Afternoon from December 2002 to August 2008. The individual chapters were collected and released into ten tankōbon volumes by Kodansha. Those volumes were localized to North America by Del Rey between January 2007 and August 2010. The series follows Ginko, a man who dedicates himself to keeping people protected from supernatural creatures called Mushi.

Mushishi has been adapted into an anime television series by Artland which aired in Fuji Television and BS Fuji between October 2005 and June 2006. It has been licensed by Funimation to its release in North America, while Madman Entertainment and Revelation Films licensed it for Australia and the United Kingdom respectively. A second anime series aired between April and December 2014, which has been licensed in North America by Aniplex of America, with two television specials airing in 2014 and an anime film released in 2015. A live-action film, directed by Katsuhiro Otomo, was released in late 2006. It has also spawned a video game and many types of Mushishi-related merchandise.

The Mushishi manga has been well received both by the public and critics. In Japan, it has frequently ranked in the weekly top ten list of best-selling manga, and the entire series has sold over 3.8 million copies. Both the manga and the anime have received several awards such as the Kodansha Manga Award and the Tokyo Anime Award, and numerous publications have praised them.

Plot
Mushishi is set in an imaginary time between the Edo and Meiji periods, featuring some 19th-century technology but with Japan still as a "closed country". The story features ubiquitous creatures called  that often display what appear as supernatural powers. It is implied that there are many more primitive lifeforms than "normal" living things such as animals, plants, fungi, and bacteria, and Mushi is the most primitive of all. Due to their ethereal nature, most humans are incapable of perceiving Mushi and are oblivious to their existence, but there are a few who possess the ability to see and interact with Mushi.

The series is an episodic anthology with no overarching plotline in which the only common elements are Ginko and the Mushi. Ginko is a man with one green eye, who not only can see various types of mushi but also attracts them. Because of this ability, he is constantly wandering and smokes in order to keep the mushi away. He appears to have a generally laid back personality, however, he can be very serious and focused on his work when it comes to protecting people from mushi. He stresses that the mushi are not evil, but merely trying to survive like everyone else. A majority of the stories do not focus on Ginko but rely on him as a catalyst to move the story forward by diagnosing or curing mushi-related illnesses and phenomena.

Media

Manga
Written and illustrated by Yuki Urushibara, Mushishi debuted as a one-shot in Kodansha's Monthly Afternoon on January 25, 1999. Later, it was serialized in Kodansha's Afternoon Season Zōkan from 1999 to 2002. It moved to Monthly Afternoon on December 25, 2002, and was serialized until August 25, 2008. Kodansha collected the chapters into ten tankōbon volumes published under the Afternoon KC line from November 20, 2000, to November 21, 2008. On November 21, 2013, Kodansha started to re-release the series in an aizōban format in their KC Deluxe line, concluding with the tenth on July 23, 2014.

At the 2006 Comic-Con, Del Rey Manga announced that it had licensed Mushishi for an English-language translation in North America. Del Rey published the first volume on January 30, 2007, and the last volume, a combined edition covering volumes 8 to 10, was released on July 27, 2010. Kodansha USA also released the manga in digital format between July 29 and August 12, 2014. The manga was also licensed in some countries such as in France by Kana, in Italy by Star Comics, in South Korea by Daewon C.I., and in Spain by Norma Editorial.

In addition, two additional chapters were published in the magazine on November 25 and December 25, 2013, respectively. They were encapsulated into a single tankōbon titled  and released on April 23, 2014. Another special short was published in Monthly Afternoon on March 25, 2021.

Volume list

Anime

The Mushishi anime adaptation was animated by Artland, directed by Hiroshi Nagahama, and produced by a group called "Mushishi Production Committee", which consists of Marvelous Entertainment, Avex Entertainment and SKY Perfect Well Think. The first 20 episodes of the series originally aired between October 23, 2005, and March 12, 2006, on Fuji Television. A digest was broadcast on May 7, 2006, by BS Fuji, which aired the last six episodes from May 14 to June 18 of the same year. Marvelous Entertainment and Avex released the series from January 25 to September 27, 2006, in five DVDs for sale, and at the same time in nine DVDs for rental. On March 28, 2008, a DVD box set containing all episodes was released; it was followed by a Blu-ray box set on March 27, 2009, and a Limited Edition Blu-ray box on December 20, 2013.

The anime series' licensing was announced by Funimation to North American release in January 2007. To promote the series' release, it hosted Nagahama at the Anime Expo 2007 between June 29 and July 2. In addition, Funimation exhibited the first four episodes in New York and Texas' locations such as ImaginAsian Theater, Studio Movie Grill, and Alamo Drafthouse, on July 23 and 24 of that year. The series was released in six DVDs between July 31, 2007, to February 26, 2008, by Funimation, which also streamed series on its own channel, Hulu, Joost, Anime News Network, Crackle, as well as distributed it to Comcast cable service. Funimation also released four box sets with all episodes: on December 16, 2008, on October 6, 2009, on July 6, 2010, and November 8, 2011. In United Kingdom, the series was released between October 22, 2007, and November 17, 2008, by Revelation Films in six DVD. Madman Entertainment acquired the series' distribution rights at AVCon in 2007, releasing it in a six-discs box set on January 14, 2009, in PAL region.

Based on the 2013 two-chapter side story, a special titled Mushishi Tokubetsu-hen: Hihamukage ("The Shadow That Devours the Sun") was broadcast on Tokyo MX, Tochigi TV, Gunma TV, and BS11 on January 4, 2014, and streamed by Niconico. Aniplex released the special on DVD and Blu-ray on April 23, 2014. A second anime television season titled  started airing on April 5, 2014, on Tokyo MX and other channels. As with the special, the second season featured the same director, the same studio and main cast from the first season. After the broadcast of the tenth episode on June 21, the "first half" was finished. Another special, aired on August 20 on BS11. The latter half of the second season started to air on October 19, and ended on December 21, 2014. Zoku-Shō first DVD compilation was released on July 23, 2014, in Japan, and the sixth—and last–was released on July 22, 2015. A sequel anime film titled , based on the manga's last arc, was announced in December 2014 and released on May 16, 2015, in Japan.

Hihamukage was streamed by Crunchyroll for premium members on January 4, 2014, and made available for free user a week later. In March, the second season was licensed for streaming by Aniplex of America and Crunchyroll as Mushi-Shi -Next Passage-. In November, Madman Entertainment acquired its home media release rights for Australia. Late in the same month, Madman also licensed the series for streaming and made it available on its site AnimeLab. Madman released a DVD box set containing all Next Passage episodes, Path of Thorns and Bell Droplets on December 7, 2016.

Other merchandise
Several books based on Mushishi have been released. A guidebook titled Mushishi Official Book was released by Kodansha on January 23, 2006. On June 30, and July 20, 2007, were released an artbook, and a book with staff commentaries on the anime series production, respectively. On June 19, 2015, a "large format" art book was released by Kodansha.

The music for both Mushishi anime adaptation was composed by Toshio Masuda. Two soundtrack albums were released by Marvelous Entertainment and Geneon Entertainment for the first anime adaptation; the first on March 24, 2006, and the second on July 23, 2006. On June 25, 2015, the soundtrack for Next Passage was released by Aniplex.

A live-action Mushishi feature film, released at the 2006 Venice International Film Festival, was directed by Katsuhiro Otomo and starred Joe Odagiri. Also known as Bugmaster and Mushi-Shi: The Movie in English, it was released in Japanese theaters on March 24, 2007.

Mushishi was also adapted into a video game; the Nintendo DS game titled  was developed by Tenky and published by Marvelous Entertainment in Japan on January 31, 2008.

From March 18 to 29, 2015, a "stage reading" event, which adapted six chapters from the manga into six separate performances, was held in Tokyo. It was directed by Mushishi anime director Hiroshi Nagahama and its original script was written by Kazuaki Nakamura, while the anime voice actors acted as their respective characters. The production used augmented reality on its visuals, which was designed to span a 270 degree field of view.

Reception

Awards and public response
The series has won numerous awards: in 2003, the manga was awarded an Excellence Prize for manga at the 7th Japan Media Arts Festival, while in 2006, the series won the Kodansha Manga Award for general manga. At the 10th Japan Media Arts Festival, both the anime and manga series were placed among the top 10 in their respective categories for best manga and anime. The anime series won grand prizes in the categories of television series and best art direction (for Takashi Waki) at the 5th Tokyo Anime Award competition held at the Tokyo International Anime Fair in 2006, while Nagahama won the Animation Kobe Individual Award for his directing. It also ranked 13th in a "Top 20" poll conducted by Japanese anime magazine Animage in 2006. In the following year, Mushishi was placed in 9th on Japan's Agency for Cultural Affairs's list of best manga, as well as ranked in 6th place on its list of best anime. Young Adult Library Services Association also listed the manga among 33 titles with "good quality literature and appealing reading for teens" in 2008.

Mushishi was also well received by Japanese-language readers. The ten volumes have sold over 3.8 million copies. Individual volumes frequently appeared on the weekly lists of best-selling manga there. Furthermore, the eighth volume was the 9th best-selling manga of Amazon.com in the first half of 2007. A similar feat was achieved by the last volume which was ranked 49th in the Oricon list of best-selling manga of the first half of 2009. In North America, ICv2 has listed the manga among the "Top 300 Graphic Novels" of the month twice. Readers of About.com voted it the best seinen manga released in North America in 2007. The sixth volume of Mushishi was also among the best-selling manga in Malaysia in the week of March 1, 2009.

Critical reception
Mushishi was chosen as the best manga of 2007 by Deb Aoki of About.com, elected the best anime series of 2007 by Anime News Network's Carl Kimlinger, and was ranked seventh by Ramsey Isler in IGN's list of the Top Anime of 2007. Aoki called it "a rare breed of manga: a smartly-written, original story that's told with simple yet mesmerizing imagery." Similarly, Kimlinger declared that "Its hypnotic rhythm, humanism, and naturalist's eye for beauty give it a charm that far outstrips mere entertainment value." Reviewer Jason Thompson intoned that while it may be "too mellow" for certain readers, he found praiseworthy its "very original vision, with a sort of 'flowing life' of its own, a biologist's precision mixed with creepy fairytales and a surreal, dreamy feel." Its storytelling was highly praised; Isler deemed it as "near flawless", while Pop Culture Shock's Ken Haley labeled it "an enjoyable and intriguing read", and Shirl Sazynski of Sequential Tart lauded its "short, spooky and breathtaking stories." Manga Life's Joy Kim stated that its lack of a central story allows one to enter at any volume, and that "the quality of the storytelling" will make fans want to read it in entirety. The "quiet and subtle stories that evoke strong emotions with great story crafting and a fine tune to the essence of what moves people" is the main appeal of the series, according to Holly Ellingwood of Active Anime. Both Ed Sizemore and Avi Weinryb, writing for Comics Worth Reading and Comic Book Bin respectively, said Mushishi has something to tell to readers, with the former commenting "If you want a manga to make you stop and think, this is the manga for you."

Mushi-Shi -Next Passage- was also well received by fans; almost all of its DVD and Blu-ray volumes made the Top 20 list of the Oricon best-selling charts. Jacob Hope Chapman of Anime News Network praised the maintenance of the visual quality and the improvement upon the quality of the stories, declaring that "Mushi-Shi is quickly evolving from an excellent series of fables about the natural world to a wholly unique masterpiece that a written review can't really do justice by." Chapman dubbed it "one of the all-time greatest animated anthology series." The Fandom Post's Kory Cerjak stated the series "is perhaps one of the most innovative shows out there in terms of storytelling." Ben Huber of Japanator praised its "soothing music and beautiful art", noting that "most anime struggle to create relatable and compelling characters in 12 or 24 episodes. Mushishi does it every week in one goddamn episode... and it does it with grace." Richard Eisenbeis of Kotaku said while it is worth watching simply for the quality of its imagery, it "is a series that is equal parts beautiful and haunting — often bringing more emotion in a 22-minute episode than most series can bring in their entire runs."

See also
 Shadow biosphere

Notes

References

External links
  
  
 

1999 manga
2005 anime television series debuts
2006 Japanese television series endings
2014 anime television series debuts
Adventure anime and manga
Aniplex
Artland (company)
Del Rey Manga
Fuji TV original programming
Funimation
Iyashikei anime and manga
Kodansha manga
Manga adapted into films
Nintendo DS-only games
Nintendo DS games
Occult detective anime and manga
Seinen manga
Supernatural anime and manga
Tokyo MX original programming
Winner of Kodansha Manga Award (General)